Franck Gross (born 26 February 1988) is a French kickboxer who has been professionally competing since 2011. He is the current WAKO Bantamweight World K1 Champion and the current ISKA Oriental Rules Featherweight champion. 

He is the former ISKA Bantamweight Champion, the former Enfusion Bantamweight World Champion,  and the former WBC Muaythai International Flyweight Champion.

Kickboxing career
Franck Gross made his first title bid in 2011, when he fought Hakim Hamech for the national kickboxing championship.  Gross would lose a unanimous decision.

In July 2014 he was scheduled to fight Romie Adanza for the WBC Muaythai International Flyweight Title. Gross won a split decision to capture his first major championship.

In 2017 he fought Laszlo Zako for the ISKA World Bantamweight title. He won the championship by a fourth round TKO.

After winning his next four fights, he faced Elshad Aleksarov for the WAKO World Bantamweight title. Gross won a unanimous decision.

Gross attempted his first ISKA title defense against Eisaku Ogasawara during Rebels 52. He lost a unanimous decision.

He won his next two fights, and would defend his WAKO title against Hissam Bougadir. Gross won a unanimous decision.

In 2018 he faced Milan Iseli for the Enfusion World Bantamweight title. Gross won the title through a unanimous decision.

Gross subsequently won 7 out of his next 8 fights, with a perfect 5-0 in 2019. During this time, he won the ISKA Featherweight Oriental Rules title, with a decision win over Djany Fiorenti.

Gross is expected to defend his Enfusion title against Jan Szajko on the 17th October. The fight fell through because of injuries.

Championships and accomplishments

Professioanl
World Boxing Council Muaythai
WBC Muaythai International Flyweight Championship (One time, former)
International Sport Karate Association
ISKA Bantamweight World K-1 Championship (One time, former)
ISKA Featherweight World Oriental Rules Championship
World Association of Kickboxing Organizations
WAKO K1 Bantamweight World Championship
One successful title defense
Enfusion
Enfusion Bantamweight World Championship

Amateur
World Association of Kickboxing Organizations
 2008 W.A.K.O. European Championships Full Contact -54kg

Kickboxing record

|-  bgcolor=
|-  bgcolor=""
| 8 Apr 2023 || ||align=left|  || Ultimate Fight Night 4 || Lons-le-Saunier, France || ||  ||  || 
|-  bgcolor="#CCFFCC"
| 10 Dec 2022 || Win ||align=left| Daniel Boszo ||  Tendil Event 4 || L'Isle-sur-la-Sorgue, France || Decision || 3 || 3:00 || 79-9-1
|-  bgcolor="#CCFFCC"
| 8 Oct 2022 || Win ||align=left| Mohamed Knidil ||  Box'in Night 4 || Nimes, France || KO || 2||  || 78-9-1
|-  bgcolor="#CCFFCC"
| 22 Jul 2022 || Win ||align=left| Alexis Sosa ||  Battle of Saint-Raphaël 8 || Saint-Raphaël, France || TKO (Punches)|| 1 || || 77-9-1
|-
|-  bgcolor="#CCFFCC"
| 11 Jun 2022 || Win ||align=left| Jordi Lopez Sampietro ||  EFC Ultimate Fight Night 3 || Lons-le-Saunier, France || Decision  || 3 || 3:00|| 76-9-1
|-
|-  bgcolor="#CCFFCC"
| 9 Oct 2021 || Win ||align=left| Marc Sabaté Peinado || Box'in Night 3 || Nimes, France || Decision (Unanimous) || 3 || 3:00|| 75-9-1
|-
|-  bgcolor="#FFBBBB"
| 18 Sep 2021 || Loss ||align=left| Djany Fiorenti || La Nuit Des Gladiateurs 12 || Marseille, France || Decision (Unanimous) || 3 || 3:00|| 74-9-1
|-
|-  bgcolor="#CCFFCC"
| 29 Jun 2019|| Win||align=left| Luc Genieys || Gala Du Phoenix 11 || Trets, France || Decision (Unanimous) || 3 || 3:00|| 74-8-1
|-
|-  bgcolor="#CCFFCC"
| 18 May 2019|| Win||align=left| Danilo Bellomo || Master Fight 2 || Chalon-sur-Saône, France || TKO  || 2 || || 73-8-1
|-
|-  bgcolor="#CCFFCC"
| 30 Mar 2019|| Win||align=left| Alexis Font || EFC Ultimate Fight Night II|| Lons-le-Saunier, France || TKO || 1 || || 73-8-1
|-
|-  bgcolor="#CCFFCC"
| 23 Feb 2019|| Win||align=left| Djany Fiorenti || Stars Night || Vitrolles, France || TKO (Doctor stoppage)  || 2 || || 72-8-1
|-
! style=background:white colspan=9 |
|-
|-  bgcolor="#CCFFCC"
| 19 Jan 2019|| Win||align=left| François Thiel || Nuit Des Gladiateurs 10 || Marseille, France || TKO (Doctor stoppage)  || 2 || || 71-8-1
|-
|-  bgcolor="#FFBBBB"
| 13 Oct 2018|| Loss||align=left| Djany Fiorenti || World GBC Tour 13 || Mazan, France || Decision (Unanimous)  || 3|| 3:00 || 70-8-1
|-
|-  bgcolor="#CCFFCC"
| 15 Sep 2018|| Win||align=left| Luc Genieys || Battle Of Saint-Raphael 6 || Saint-Raphaël, France || Decision (Unanimous)  || 3|| 3:00 || 70-7-1
|-
|-  bgcolor="#CCFFCC"
| 22 Jun 2018|| Win||align=left| Nordine Aissaoui || A1 World Grand Prix || Alger, Algeria || Decision (Unanimous)  || 3|| 3:00 || 69-7-1
|-
|-  bgcolor="#CCFFCC"
| 10 Feb 2018|| Win||align=left| Milan Iseli || Enfusion Live - Phenix Boxing Only || Sallanches, France || Decision (Unanimous)  || 5 || 3:00 ||  68-7-1
|-
! style=background:white colspan=9 |
|-
|-  bgcolor="#CCFFCC"
| 20 Jan 2018|| Win||align=left| Hissam Bougadir || Championnat Du Monde K1 ||  Morocco || Decision (Unanimous)  || 5 || 3:00|| 67-7-1
|-
! style=background:white colspan=9 |
|-
|-  bgcolor="#CCFFCC"
| 9 Dec 2017|| Win||align=left| Martin Blanco || Kick's Night ||  Agde, France || Decision (Unanimous)  || 3|| 3:00 || 66-7-1
|-
|-  bgcolor="#CCFFCC"
| 28 Oct 2017|| Win||align=left| Tarik Totts || Aix Fight Tour Niglo ||  Aix-en-Provence, France || Decision (Unanimous)  || 3|| 3:00 || 65-7-1
|-
|-  bgcolor="#FFBBBB"
| 6 Sep 2017|| Loss||align=left| Eisaku Ogasawara || Rebels.52 ||  Bunkyo, Japan || Decision (Unanimous)  || 5 || 3:00 || 64-7-1
|-
! style=background:white colspan=9 |
|-
|-  bgcolor="#CCFFCC"
| 30 Jun 2017|| Win||align=left| Elshad Aleksarov || Monte-Carlo Fighting Trophy ||  Monaco || Decision (Unanimous)  || 5|| 3:00 || 64-6-1
|-
! style=background:white colspan=9 |
|-
|-  bgcolor="#CCFFCC"
| 26 May 2017|| Win||align=left| Jamal Lahrisi Manzano || Ultimate Fight Night ||  Le Beausset, France || Decision (Unanimous)  || 3|| 3:00 || 63-6-1
|-
|-  bgcolor="#CCFFCC"
| 6 May 2017|| Win||align=left| Milan Iseli || Phenix Boxing Only Edition 5 ||  Saint-Julien-en-Genevois, France || KO  || 3|| || 62-6-1
|-
|-  bgcolor="#CCFFCC"
| 8 Apr 2017|| Win||align=left| Mounir Ouali || XI eme Trophée Des Etoiles ||  Gardanne, France || KO  || 1|| || 61-6-1
|-
|-  bgcolor="#CCFFCC"
| 11 Mar 2017|| Win||align=left| Laszlo Zako || Power Trophy ||  Orange, France || TKO  || 4|| || 60-6-1
|-
! style=background:white colspan=9 |
|-
|-  bgcolor="#CCFFCC"
| 21 Jan 2017|| Win||align=left| Olivier Moriano || La Nuit Des Gladiateurs ||  Marseille, France || TKO  || 3|| || 59-6-1
|-
|-  bgcolor="#CCFFCC"
| 10 Dec 2016|| Win||align=left| Samuel Babayan || Full Night X ||  Agde, France || Decision (Unanimous)  || 3|| 3:00|| 58-6-1
|-
|-  bgcolor="#FFBBBB"
| 19 Nov 2016|| Loss||align=left| Hakim Hamech || Nuit des Champions 2016 || Marseille, France || Decision (Unanimous)  || 3|| 3:00|| 57-6-1
|-
|-  bgcolor="#CCFFCC"
| 8 Oct 2016|| Win||align=left| Zakaria Miri || World GBC Tour 11 || Mazan, France || Decision (Unanimous)  || 3|| 3:00|| 57-5-1
|-
|-  bgcolor="#CCFFCC"
| 17 Sep 2016|| Win||align=left| Manolis Kalistis || Battle Of Saint-Raphael 4 || Saint-Raphaël, France || TKO  || 2|| || 56-5-1
|-
|-  bgcolor="#CCFFCC"
| 21 May 2016|| Win||align=left| Roberto Bonetti || Xeme Trophée des Etoiles || Aix-en-Provence, France || Decision (Unanimous)  || 3|| 3:00 || 55-5-1
|-
|-  bgcolor="#CCFFCC"
| 30 Apr 2016|| Win||align=left| Victor Heider || MFC 5 || Lons-le-Saunier, France || Decision (Unanimous) || 3|| 3:00 || 54-5-1
|-
|-  bgcolor="#FFBBBB"
| 13 Feb 2016|| Loss||align=left| Mathis Dnjanoyan || Stars Night || Vitrolles, France || Decision (Unanimous) || 3|| 3:00 || 53-5-1
|-
|-  bgcolor="#CCFFCC"
| 21 Jan 2016|| Win||align=left| Anthony Basilicani || MFC 3 || Seyssins, France || Decision (Unanimous) || 3|| 3:00 || 53-4-1
|-
|-  bgcolor="#CCFFCC"
| 19 Jul 2014|| Win||align=left| Romie Adanza || Hot Summer Fights ||  Cabazon, California, US || Decision (Split)  || 5|| 3:00|| 52-4-1
|-
! style=background:white colspan=9 |
|-  bgcolor="#fbb"
| 6 Jun 2012|| Loss||align=left| Kenji Kubo || RISE 88||  Tokyo, Japan|| KO (Left Hook to the Body)  ||3|| 0:29||
|-  bgcolor="#FFBBBB"
| 30 Apr 2011|| Loss||align=left| Hakim Hamech || K-1 Rules || Monaco || Decision (Unanimous)  || 5|| 3:00|| 
|-
! style=background:white colspan=9 |
|-
|-
| colspan=9 | Legend:

See also
List of male kickboxers

References 

1988 births
Living people
French male kickboxers
Sportspeople from Gard